Jana Králová is a retired Czech football defender, who has played throughout her career for Slavia Prague in the Czech First Division.

Králová has been a member of the Czech national team. She made her debut for the national team on 29 May 2009 in a match against Poland.

References

1987 births
Living people
Czech women's footballers
Czech Republic women's international footballers
Footballers from Prague
Women's association football defenders
SK Slavia Praha (women) players
Czech Women's First League players